Frank Flores may refer to:
 Frank Flores (swimmer)
 Frank Flores (football manager)

See also
 Francisco Flores (disambiguation)